Gol Baghi (also Romanized as Gol Bāghī, Golbāghī, Golbākhī, and Gulbākhi) is a village in Nurabad Rural District, in the Central District of Delfan County, Lorestan Province, Iran. At the 2006 census, its population was 256, in 52 families.

References 

Towns and villages in Delfan County